Hicks from the Sticks is a compilation album released in 1980. The album was the brainchild of music journalist Nigel Burnham who wanted to showcase the best new wave bands in the North of England.

The album was reissued on the Thunderbolt label in 1985 as Future Shock.

Track listing

Rockburgh Records LP: ROC 111

Thunderbolt 1985 reissue as Future Shock LP: THBL 012

Thunderbolt 1994 reissue as Future Shock CD: CDTB 012

Credits 
 Conceived, compiled and compilation produced by Nigel Burnham
 Mastered by Mike Brown

References 

1980 compilation albums
New wave compilation albums